The Recipe may refer to:

 The Recipe (album), a 1998 album by Mack 10
 The Recipe (film), a 2010 South Korean film
 "The Recipe" (Kendrick Lamar song), a 2012 song by Kendrick Lamar
 The Recipe, a 2009 album by Mambo Sauce
 "The Recipe", a song by 10 Years from the 2005 album The Autumn Effect
 "The Recipe", a song by JK-47 from the 2020 album Made for This
 "The Recipe", a song by Kodak Black from the 2017 album Project Baby 2
 "The Recipe", a song by Reks from the 2016 album The Greatest X

See also 
 Recipe, a set of instructions for preparing something, especially food
 The Recipe for Gertrude, an anime serialization
 The Recipe Project, a CD/book collaboration between chefs and musicians